Nebwenenef was High Priest of Amun at the beginning of the reign of Ramesses II during the 19th Dynasty.  Prior to that, Nebwenenef had served as High Priest of Anhur and High Priest of Hathor during the reign of Seti I and possibly even earlier.

Titles
In his tomb (TT157) a large number of titles are recorded as being held by Nebwenenef: 
 High Priest of Amun
 High Priest of Anhur
 High Priest of Hathor
 Superintendent of the double treasury of silver and gold (of Amun)
 Superintendent of the granary
 Chief of Works and Chief of all the craftsmen in Thebes
 Superintendent of Prophets of all Gods, to his South (as far) as Heriheramun, and to his North, (as far) as Thinis
 Noble
 Count
 God's Father
 Chief of Secrets in heaven, earth and the Netherworld(?)
 Dignitary for the People
 Chief of Seers, pure of hands in Thebes
 Superintendent of the Prophets of South and North Egypt
 Chief of Secrets in Southern Heliopolis (Thebes)

Family
Nebwenenef's wife was named Takhat. She held the titles of Chief of the Harem of Amun, Sistrum Player of Mut, Chief of the Harem of Hathor and Songstress of Isis the mighty. Nebwenenef had a son Sematawy (II) and a daughter named Hathor. Sematawy (II) succeeded his father as High Priest of Hathor. Hathor held the title of Chief of the Harem of Hathor, Lady of Dendera. A sister of Nebwenenef named Irytnofret is also depicted on the tomb.

According to an inscription in his tomb, Nebwenenef was the son of a High Priest of Hathor. A statue of A priest of Hathor named Basa dated to the 22nd or 23rd dynasty records a detailed genealogy claiming that Basa is a direct descendant of Nebwenenef.

The text states that Nebwenenef was the son of the First Prophet of Hathor, overseer of the cattle, overseer of the fields, overseer of the granary, Sematawy (I). The text goes on to list further ancestors holding the title First Prophets of Hathor: Sa-en-Hathor (II), Amenhotep, Sa-Hathor (I) and Nefer. The genealogy provides the names the long line of High Priests of Hathor referred to in the Theban Tomb.

Life

Before being appointed High Priest of Amun, Nebwenenef was High Priest of Hathor at Dendera and High Priest of Anhur at Thinis. After his appointment as High Priest of Amun in year 1 of Ramesses II, his son Sematawy became High Priest of Hathor. This post had apparently always been held by his family according to an inscription:

After the announcement King Ramesses II gave him two gold signet rings and an electrum staff of office. All at once Nebwenenef had been promoted to High priest of Amun, Superintendent of the double treasury of silver and gold (of Amun), superintendent of the granary, Chief of Works and Chief of all the craftsmen in Thebes. A royal envoy was dispatched to announce Nebwenenef's promotion throughout the land.

Tomb

Nebwenenef was buried in the Theban Tomb TT157 is located in Dra' Abu el-Naga', part of the Theban Necropolis, on the west bank of the Nile, opposite to Luxor.

Nebwenenef is shown in his tomb followed by a fan-bearer appearing before Ramesses II and Queen Nefertari in a palace window. Nebwenenef is being appointed as High priest of Amun (year 1 of Rameses II).

Nebwenenef's wife, named Takhat, is depicted in the tomb. She held the titles of Chief of the Harem of Amun, Sistrum Player of Mut, Chief of the Harem of Hathor and Songstress of Isis the mighty. Nebwenenef had a son Sematawy (II) and a daughter named Hathor. Sematawy (II) succeeded his father as High Priest of Hathor. Hathor held the title of Chief of the Harem of Hathor, Lady of Dendera. A sister of Nebwenenef named Irytnofret is also depicted on the tomb.

In the 19th century the tomb was recorded by Lepsius (LD Text iii, p 239).

The tomb had been excavated since 1970 by a team from the University of Pennsylvania under the leadership of Dr. Lanny Bell. Since 2002 the Universities of Heidelberg and Leipzig have joined in the work on Nebwenenef's tomb.

Mortuary temple
Nebwenenef was also the owner of a mortuary temple at Thebes. Nebwenenef is one of only a select group of commoners who were allowed to construct a temple there. A plan of the temple, as well as some photographs of stelae and foundation deposits, can be found on Digitalegypt (University College London).

References

Theban High Priests of Amun
People of the Nineteenth Dynasty of Egypt
13th-century BC clergy
Ramesses II
Hathor